Kitty Lange Kielland (8 October 1843 – 1 October 1914) was a Norwegian landscape painter.

Early life and training

Kielland was born to an affluent family in Stavanger, the older sister of Alexander Kielland. Kielland's interactions with her brother were important in her development as an artist. Although she received some training in drawing and painting, it was not until she turned thirty that she was allowed to train as a professional artist. In 1873 she traveled to Karlsruhe where she was trained by Hans Gude. As a woman Kielland was forced to take private lessons from Gude instead of joining his landscape painting class. Gude's adherence to realism left a lasting impression on Kielland that was visible in her later works. Kielland made rapid progress during the two years she spent training with Gude.

Munich
Kielland left Karlsruhe for Munich in 1875 where she joined a colony of Norwegian artists living there. In Munich she studied with French-inspired realist Hermann Baisch, and with Norwegian Eilif Peterssen whom some consider to be her most important teacher. Kielland lived in Munich until 1878. She then moved to Paris, where she continued painting daily.

Jæren
In 1876 Kielland visited Jæren in southern Norway. Kielland's former teacher Hans Gude had visited Jæren in 1869 and 1872 and upon his return had suggested to her that she should travel there and paint it. Kielland prepared studies while she was in Jæren and later used these to paint the characteristically flat landscape when she returned to Munich, making her the first artist to do so. Her painting of Jæren shows a realistic depiction of the landscape, but with unifying atmospheric effects. Kielland returned to Jæren regularly during the summers, and so the monotonous landscape and peat bogs of the area became one of her favorite motifs. Kielland said that she was so interested in the area around Jæren because of "the grandeur of the landscape and the wealth of poverty". The skill with which the landscape was executed marks her as one of Gude's most outstanding students.

Paris
In 1879 Kielland moved to Paris, where she shared a studio with fellow Norwegian Harriet Backer from 1880-88. In Paris she exhibited her paintings for the first time. Kielland was briefly a pupil of the landscape painter Léon Germain Pelouse who lived in nearby Cernay-la-Ville. Kielland left Paris in 1889, a portrait of her painted by Anna Ancher shortly before her departure can be found in Anchers Hus.

Later life and death
Kielland worked on simplifying her art in the 1890s under the influence of Jens Ferdinand Willumsen. She participated eagerly in public debates regarding women's rights. Kielland exhibited her work at the Palace of Fine Arts at the 1893 World's Columbian Exposition in Chicago, Illinois.

Kielland painted little towards the end of her life. She suffered from senile dementia for several years, and finally died in Kristiania in 1914.

A street in Bærum, a suburb west of Oslo, is named for her.

Selected works

References

External links 

 Norwegian & American Women of Distinction: Kitty Kielland
 images of Kitty Kielland's painting on The Athenaeum
 Kitty Kielland on askART
 A Mirror of Nature: Nordic Landscape Painting 1840-1910 Kitty Lange Kielland

1843 births
1914 deaths
Norwegian landscape painters
Realist painters
19th-century Norwegian people
19th-century Norwegian painters
20th-century Norwegian painters
19th-century Norwegian women artists
20th-century Norwegian women artists
Norwegian women painters
Norwegian Association for Women's Rights people